Suam may refer to:

 Suam, Uganda, a town in the Eastern Region of Uganda
 Suam, Kenya, a town in Trans-Nzoia County, Kenya
 Suam River, a river that separates the two towns and forms the international border between Uganda and Kenya
 Suam Market, a street market in Nam-gu, Ulsan, South Korea
 Suam, Scotland, an island in the Outer Hebrides

Other uses
Suam language - a language spoken in Papua New Guinea